Adolphe Mercier (10 June 1878 – 2 January 1956) was a Swiss equestrian. He competed at the 1924 Summer Olympics and the 1928 Summer Olympics.

References

External links
 

1878 births
1956 deaths
Swiss male equestrians
Olympic equestrians of Switzerland
Equestrians at the 1924 Summer Olympics
Equestrians at the 1928 Summer Olympics
Place of birth missing